Elson Halt railway station was a station to the northwest of Ellesmere, Shropshire, England. The station was opened in 1937 and finally closed in 1962.

References

Further reading

Disused railway stations in Shropshire
Railway stations in Great Britain opened in 1937
Railway stations in Great Britain closed in 1940
Railway stations in Great Britain opened in 1946
Railway stations in Great Britain closed in 1962
1937 establishments in England
1962 disestablishments in England
Former Great Western Railway stations